Richie Sanders (born August 6, 1963) is an American politician who served in the Kentucky House of Representatives from the 19th district from 1991 to 1996 and in the Kentucky Senate from the 9th district from 1996 to 2009.

References

1963 births
Living people
Republican Party members of the Kentucky House of Representatives
Republican Party Kentucky state senators